Angla Township (Mandarin: 昂拉乡) is a township in Jainca County, Huangnan Tibetan Autonomous Prefecture, Qinghai, China. In 2010, Angla Township had a total population of 2,449 people: 1,250 males and 1,199 females: 569 under 14 years old, 1,687 aged between 15 and 64 and 193 over 65 years old.

References 
 

Township-level divisions of Qinghai
Huangnan Tibetan Autonomous Prefecture